S/2018 J 4 is a small outer natural satellite of Jupiter discovered by Scott S. Sheppard on 11 May 2018, using the 4.0-meter Víctor M. Blanco Telescope at Cerro Tololo Observatory, Chile. It was announced by the Minor Planet Center on 20 January 2023, after observations were collected over a long enough time span to confirm the satellite's orbit.

S/2018 J 4 is an irregular moon of Jupiter on an highly inclined prograde orbit at an angle of 53° with respect to the ecliptic plane. It belongs to the same group as the similarly-inclined moon Carpo, which was long thought to be an outlier until the discovery of S/2018 J 4. Like all irregular moons of Jupiter, S/2018 J 4's orbit is highly variable over time due to gravitational perturbations by the Sun and other planets.

Like Carpo, S/2018 J 4's very high inclination subjects it to the Lidov–Kozai resonance, where there is a periodic exchange between its orbital eccentricity and inclination while its argument of pericenter oscillates about a constant value without apsidally precessing. For example, the Lidov–Kozai resonance causes Carpo's eccentricity and inclination to fluctuate between 0.19–0.69 and 44–59°, respectively. S/2018 J 4's argument of pericenter oscillates about 270° with respect to the ecliptic, which keeps its perijove always above Jupiter and apojove below Jupiter.

References 

Moons of Jupiter
Irregular satellites
20180511
Discoveries by Scott S. Sheppard
Moons with a prograde orbit